Harry Manfield (1 February 1855 – 9 February 1925) was a British Liberal Party politician. He was the Member of Parliament (MP) for Mid Northamptonshire from 1906 to 1918. He was also a prominent Freemason.

References

External links 
 

1855 births
1925 deaths
UK MPs 1906–1910
UK MPs 1910
UK MPs 1910–1918
Liberal Party (UK) MPs for English constituencies